Chandrapur (meaning moon city) may refer to the following places in India:

 Chandrapur, a city and headquarters of Chandrapur district, Maharashtra
 Chandrapur district, a district in Nagpur Division, Maharashtra
 Chandrapur, Ahmednagar, a village in Ahmednagar district, Maharashtra
 Chandrapur, Bagnan I, a census town in Howrah district, West Bengal
 Chandrapur, Bardhaman, a village in Bardhaman district, West Bengal
 Chandrapur, Birbhum, a village in Birbhum district, West Bengal
 Chandrapur, West Bengal, a census town in North 24 Parganas district, West Bengal